Harris Brandt Tchilimbou Mavoungou (born 11 November 1988) is a Congolese football player who is currently playing for Bloemfontein Celtic.

Career
Tchilimbou began his senior career in Saint Michel d'Ouenzé and played two years for the club before signed with CARA Brazzaville. After one year with CARA joined to AC CNFF and later AS Police de Pointe-Noire.

International career
Tchilimbou was member of the Republic of the Congo under-20 team at the 2007 FIFA U-20 World Cup in Canada and played 4 games.

He made his senior cap at the World Cup Qualifying match against Mali on 1 June 2008.

International goals
Scores and results list Congo's goal tally first.

References

External links

1988 births
Living people
Sportspeople from Brazzaville
Republic of the Congo footballers
Republic of the Congo international footballers
Saint Michel d'Ouenzé players
CARA Brazzaville players
ACNFF players
CSMD Diables Noirs players
Shabab Al-Ordon Club players
Étoile du Congo players
AC Léopards players
Free State Stars F.C. players
Bloemfontein Celtic F.C. players
South African Premier Division players
Republic of the Congo expatriate footballers
Expatriate footballers in Jordan
Republic of the Congo expatriate sportspeople in Jordan
Expatriate footballers in Gabon
Republic of the Congo expatriate sportspeople in Gabon
Expatriate soccer players in South Africa
Republic of the Congo expatriate sportspeople in South Africa

Association football midfielders